Delias ottonia is a species of pierine butterfly  endemic to Mindanao in the Philippines.

The wingspan is 73–80 mm.

Subspecies
Delias ottonia ottonia (Mindanao)
Delias ottonia semperorum Schroeder & Treadaway, 2009 (Basilan Island)
Delias ottonia surigaoensis Yagishita & Morita, 1996 (Tandag, Surigao, northern Mindanao)

References

 , 2009: Three new Lepidoptera taxa from the southern Philippines (Lepidoptera: Nymphalidae: Pieridae). Nachr. entomol. Ver. Apollo N.F. 30 (1–2): 77–80

External links
images representing Delias ottonia

ottonia
Butterflies described in 1890
Butterflies of Asia